The third season of The Fresh Prince of Bel-Air premiered on September 14, 1992, and concluded on May 10, 1993. This would be the last season to feature Janet Hubert-Whitten as Vivian Banks, as she left the show for professional and personal reasons. Janet Hubert-Whitten was replaced by Daphne Maxwell Reid in the show's fourth season and for the remainder of the show's run. Additionally, the character Nicky Banks was added to the cast toward the end of the season as Phillip and Vivian's newborn son, due to Hubert-Whitten's pregnancy.

During the third season, the show was No. 1 among teenage viewers and was the top-rated comedy series among viewers aged 18 to 49.

Episodes 

Will Smith, James Avery, Karyn Parsons, and Tatyana M. Ali were present for all episodes.
Alfonso Ribeiro was absent for one episode.
Janet Hubert-Whitten and Joseph Marcell were absent for three episodes each.
DJ Jazzy Jeff was present for seven episodes.

References

External links 
 
 

1992 American television seasons
1993 American television seasons
The Fresh Prince of Bel-Air seasons